Braxton Family Christmas is the first Christmas album, and second studio album overall, by R&B female group The Braxtons. “Braxton Family Christmas” is the only album to feature all five Braxton sisters. The album was released on October 30, 2015, by Def Jam.

Background and composition
Braxton Family Christmas consists of eight tracks, including three covers of Christmas standards and carols ("This Christmas", "O' Holy Night", and "Mary, Did You Know?"), three original songs ("Every Day is Christmas", "Blessed New Year", and "Under My Christmas Tree") and a cover of Wham!'s "Last Christmas".

The family's reality show, Braxton Family Values, featured footage of the sisters throughout the recording process.

Critical reaction
The Black Media reviewed the album in an article, "The Braxton Family finally got it done. For four years fans have been waiting for the sisters to put a project out, together! We've seen Tamar Braxton's solo success, chart-topping hits, and grammy nods. Trina's successful single releases, and Bar Chix grand opening, Towanda's acting career, and assistant training services. Traci's radio career, and successful solo career and amazing album release, and of course Toni Braxton's return to music going platinum with Baby Face and winning a Grammy after almost quitting. Fans wanted one thing, a joint album...and we've got it".

Soul Tracks reviewed the album in an article, "With unpredictable sales of full-length albums over the past decade, artist holiday collections have grown more scarce. That's why the release of a seasonal set by an act as storied and soulful as The Braxtons is a most welcome gift. Although only eight songs in length, Braxton Family Christmas is a delightful listen marked by an even mixture of standards and originals. It might not go down in history as memorably as sister Toni's own Snowflakes from 2001 (or Tamar's Winter Loversland from 2013), but hearing the five siblings together on several tracks for the first time in decades makes for some noteworthy musical moments. Toni serves as executive producer of Braxton Family Christmas, and she is, in fact, the focal point of roughly half the set (being the sole vocalist on the opening rendition of Donny Hathaway's "This Christmas" and the newly composed ballad, "Blessed New Year").

Tamar, Trina, Towanda, and Traci, however, brighten things harmonically—and with a few solo spots—on a finely tuned a cappella reading of "O' Holy Night" and a nostalgic remake of Wham!'s "Last Christmas." But perhaps the high point of the set is a full-hearted, majestic interpretation of "Mary, Did You Know?" Toni's rich, deep tones and delicate phrasing make a bold impact from the get-go, with a touching string arrangement by Lee Blaske providing a sentimental feeling that's in perfect complement. The sisters trade leads throughout the tune, climaxing with an impassioned vocal interplay that is powerful without going over the top. Close in effect, but on a more lighthearted note, the upbeat "Every Day Is Christmas" (co-written by Toni and Babyface) evokes a warm mood with mellow production by Antonio Dixon and smoothly honed harmonies enhancing the verses and engaging chorus.

It's the stuff that both soul and pop holiday classics are made of, with relatable lyrics and a sing-along melody to bring the message home: "Every day's Christmas 'cause of you/winter and fall and springtime, too/Got me all wrapped up, yes you do...Wish the whole world could feel the way I do." Rounding out the Braxton Family Christmas festivities is a lush ballad, "Under My Christmas Tree," written by brother Michael (who duets with Toni atop a piano-driven backdrop graced by a soothing trumpet solo) and the 'Braxton Family Version' of "This Christmas." The latter makes for a feel-good closer with a lively rhythmic structure and colorful, slightly jazzy background vocal arrangements. Straightforward, merry, and also spiritual with consistently authoritative vocals, Braxton Family Christmas is an ideal addition to the collection of any lover of uplifting holiday music.

Singles
On November 5, 2015 "Every Day is Christmas" was released as the first single. The audio-video for "Every Day is Christmas" was released on VEVO on November 9, 2015."

Commercial performance
Braxton Family Christmas debuted at number 144 on the US Billboard 200 on January 9, 2016. The album charted at number 27 on the US Billboard R&B/Hip-Hop Albums, number 10 on the US R&B Chart, and number 12 on US Top Holiday Albums on November 21, 2015. The album charted at number 4 on the US Heatseekers Albums on December 12, 2015, and has since peaked at number 1. The seasonal effort has sold 21,000 to date.

Promotion
The Braxtons performed "Mary, Did You Know?" and "Under My Christmas Tree" with their brother Michael Braxton Jr on the daytime talk show The Real (which the youngest Braxton sibling Tamar co-hosted) on December 18, 2015.

Track listing

Credits and personnel

 Performers and musicians

Toni Braxton - Vocals, Background
Traci Braxton - Vocals, Background
Towanda Braxton - Vocals, Background
Trina Braxton - Vocals, Background
Tamar Braxton - Vocals, Background
Michael Braxton Jr. - Vocals, Background (track 7)

 Technical personnel

Toni Braxton - Composer, Producer
Antonio Dixon	- Composer, Producer
Kenneth "Babyface" Edmonds - Composer, Producer
Khristopher Riddick-Tynes - Composer, Producer
Michael Braxton - Composer
Adolphe-Charles Adam - Composer
Buddy Greene - Composer
Donny Hathaway - Composer
Harold Lilly - Composer
Mark Lowry - Composer
Nadine McKinnor - Composer
George Michael - Composer
Leon Thomas III - Composer

Charts

Release history

References

2015 Christmas albums
Christmas albums by American artists
Contemporary R&B Christmas albums
Def Jam Recordings albums
The Braxtons albums
Gospel Christmas albums
Pop Christmas albums